Aleurocanthus is a genus of whiteflies in the family Aleyrodidae.

Species

Aleurocanthus arecae David & Manjunatha, 2003
Aleurocanthus ayyari Regu & David, 1993
Aleurocanthus bambusae (Peal, 1903)
Aleurocanthus bangalorensis Dubey & Sundararaj, 2004
Aleurocanthus banksiae (Maskell, 1896)
Aleurocanthus brevispinosus Dumbleton, 1961
Aleurocanthus calophylli (Kotinsky, 1907)
Aleurocanthus ceracroceus Martin, 1999
Aleurocanthus cheni Young, 1942
Aleurocanthus chiengmaiensis Takahashi, 1942
Aleurocanthus cinnamomi Takahashi, 1931
Aleurocanthus citriperdus Quaintance & Baker, 1916
Aleurocanthus clitoriae Jesudasan & David, 1991
Aleurocanthus cocois Corbett, 1927
Aleurocanthus corbetti Takahashi, 1951
Aleurocanthus davidi David & Subramaniam, 1976
Aleurocanthus delottoi Cohic, 1969
Aleurocanthus dissimilis Quaintance & Baker, 1917
Aleurocanthus esakii Takahashi, 1936
Aleurocanthus eugeniae Takahashi, 1933
Aleurocanthus euphorbiae Jesudasan & David, 1991
Aleurocanthus ficicola David, 1993
Aleurocanthus firmianae Dubey & Sundararaj, 2004
Aleurocanthus froggatti Martin, 1999
Aleurocanthus gateri Corbett, 1927
Aleurocanthus goaensis Dubey & Sundararaj, 2004
Aleurocanthus gordoniae Takahashi, 1941
Aleurocanthus gymnosporiae Jesudasan & David, 1991
Aleurocanthus hibisci Corbett, 1935
Aleurocanthus hirsutus (Maskell, 1896)
Aleurocanthus husaini Corbett, 1939
Aleurocanthus imperialis Cohic, 1968
Aleurocanthus inceratus Silvestri, 1927
Aleurocanthus indicus David & Regu, 1989
Aleurocanthus ixorae Jesudasan & David, 1991
Aleurocanthus leptadeniae Cohic, 1968
Aleurocanthus lobulatus Jesudasan & David, 1991
Aleurocanthus longispinus Quaintance & Baker, 1917
Aleurocanthus loyolae David & Subramaniam, 1976
Aleurocanthus luteus Martin, 1985
Aleurocanthus mackenziei Cohic, 1969
Aleurocanthus mangiferae Quaintance & Baker, 1917
Aleurocanthus martini David, 1993
Aleurocanthus marudamalaiensis David & Subramanium, 1976
Aleurocanthus mayumbensis Cohic, 1966
Aleurocanthus multispinosus Dumbleton, 1961
Aleurocanthus musae David & Jesudasan, 2002
Aleurocanthus mvoutiensis Cohic, 1966
Aleurocanthus niger Corbett, 1926
Aleurocanthus nigricans Corbett, 1926
Aleurocanthus nudus Dumbleton, 1961
Aleurocanthus palauensis Kuwana, 1931
Aleurocanthus papuanus Martin, 1985
Aleurocanthus pendleburyi Corbett, 1935
Aleurocanthus piperis (Maskell, 1896)
Aleurocanthus regis Mound, 1965
Aleurocanthus rugosa Singh, 1931
Aleurocanthus russellae Jesudasan & David, 1991
Aleurocanthus satyanarayani Dubey & Sundararaj, 2004
Aleurocanthus serratus Quaintance & Baker, 1917
Aleurocanthus seshadrii David & Subramaniam, 1976
Aleurocanthus shillongensis Jesudasan & David, 1991
Aleurocanthus siamensis Takahashi, 1942
Aleurocanthus singhi Jesudasan & David, 1991
Aleurocanthus spiniferus (Quaintance, 1903) (citrus spiny whitefly)
Aleurocanthus spinithorax Dumbleton, 1961
Aleurocanthus spinosus (Kuwana, 1911)
Aleurocanthus splendens David & Subramaniam, 1976
Aleurocanthus strychnosicola Cohic, 1966
Aleurocanthus terminaliae Dubey & Sundararaj, 2004
Aleurocanthus trispina Mound, 1965
Aleurocanthus t-signatum (Maskell, 1896)
Aleurocanthus valenciae Martin & Carver, 1999
Aleurocanthus valparaiensis David & Subramaniam, 1976
Aleurocanthus vindhyachali Dubey & Sundararaj, 2004
Aleurocanthus voeltzkowi (Newstead, 1908)
Aleurocanthus woglumi Ashby, 1915 (citrus blackfly)
Aleurocanthus zizyphi Priesner & Hosny, 1934

References

Whiteflies
Sternorrhyncha genera